King George Sound is a sound on the south coast of Western Australia. Named King George the Third's Sound in 1791, it was referred to as King George's Sound from 1805. The name "King George Sound" gradually came into use from about 1934, prompted by new Admiralty charts supporting the intention to eliminate the possessive 's' from geographical names.

Situated at its western shore is the city of Albany.
The sound is bordered by the mainland to the north, by Vancouver Peninsula on the west, and by Bald Head and Flinders Peninsula to the south.  Although the sound is open water to the east, the waters are partially protected by Breaksea Island and Michaelmas Island.  There are two harbours located within the sound, Princess Royal Harbour to the west and Oyster Harbour to the north. Each receives excellent protection from winds and heavy seas.  Princess Royal Harbour was Western Australia's only deep-water port for around 70 years until the Fremantle Inner Harbour was opened in 1897.

History

The first reported visit to King George Sound by a European was in 1791 by the English explorer Captain George Vancouver. Vancouver named it King George the Third's Sound after the reigning monarch.

The next Europeans to visit the sound were Captain Dennis of the Kingston, and Captain Dixson of the Elligood. Kingston and Elligood were whalers and while there caught three whales. Dixson left an inscribed piece of copper plate behind.

Matthew Flinders anchored in the sound from 8 December 1801 to 5 January 1802 and explored the area. While he was there, his men found the copper plate Dixson had left. During this time Robert Brown (ship's botanist) and Peter Good (ship's gardener) collected samples of over 500 plant species.

Nicolas Baudin arrived in the sound in February 1803 aboard Le Geographe to rendezvous with Louis de Freycinet aboard the  before doing further exploration of the Western Australian coastline. During the course of their stay the ship's naturalist François Péron, collected 1060 new species of shellfish and a large number of starfish from the sound.

Phillip Parker King visited the sound in 1818 aboard the cutter  while en route to conduct a nautical survey of the North West Cape, and Frenchman Dumont d'Urville visited it in 1826 aboard the Astrolabe.

On 25 December 1826, the New South Wales colonial government brig Amity, under the command of Major Edmund Lockyer, arrived at King George Sound to establish a possessory military settlement. Lockyer named his settlement Fredrick Town after George III's second son, Prince Frederick, Duke of York and Albany, but this name never gained wide acceptance. Instead the settlement and surrounding locality were usually referred to as King George's Sound. In 1832, Governor of Western Australia Captain (later Admiral) James Stirling declared the settlement a town and renamed it Albany, but the broader locality continued to be referred to as King George's Sound for many years.

In 1834 Robert Dale published in London a panorama print of the view from Mount Clarence accompanied by a pamphlet describing the sound and the geography, geology, flora, fauna and native inhabitants of the immediate region.

On 8 March 1836, HMS Beagle visited King George Sound and anchored there for eight days. On board was the young naturalist Charles Darwin, who collected specimens on shore. Beagle was on the homeward leg of her celebrated circumnavigation of the world, having already stopped off at Sydney.

Until the construction of Fremantle Harbour in 1897, King George Sound contained the only deepwater port in Western Australia, and so was the favoured location for delivery of mail and supplies from abroad to Western Australia. These were then transported to Perth and Fremantle by road or coastal shipping until the early 1890s, when the completion of the Great Southern Railway provided a quicker service.

Albany Port is located on the north shore of Princess Royal Harbour adjacent to the city of Albany. The port was first established in 1826 and has been expanded regularly since. The port now has five berths able to cater to panamax class vessels. The port typically caters for loading of about 120 vessels per annum.

In 1914, King George Sound was the last Australian anchorage for the fleet taking the first Australian and New Zealand soldiers, later to become known as Anzacs, to Egypt. A memorial to the Anzacs of the Desert Mounted Corps has been established on top of Mount Clarence. Albany was where the first commemorative dawn service was held on Anzac Day, 25 April 1923. The contribution of Mustafa Kemal Atatürk, president of Turkey from 1923 until 1938 is recognised by naming the entrance into Princess Royal Harbour as Atatürk Entrance.

There is evidence that shore-based bay whaling was carried out in Barker Bay, by James Daniels, as early as 1849. Whaling ships from Hobart also visited the area in the 2nd half of the 19th century. The Cheyne Beach Whaling Company began operating out of Frenchman Bay, located within the sound, in 1952 with a small quota of 50 humpback whales that was eventually increased to 175. At the peak of the whaling activity in the sound the company was taking between 900 and 1100 sperm and humpback whales in a year. Humpback whaling was banned in 1963 which in turn decreased the viability of the operation.

In 1978 the Cheynes Beach Whaling Company closed down after increasing environmental lobby group pressure. It was Australia's last coastal whaling company.

Installation of a shark barrier was commenced and completed in March 2016 at Middleton Beach at the north western end of the sound.

Flora 
Dense seagrass beds still exist in King George Sound, although they have been adversely affected by increased nutrient levels and industry in the area.  Some of the seagrasses present in the sound include Posidonia australis, Posidonia robertsoneae, Posidonia kirkmanii, Posidonia sinuosa, Posidonia denhartogii, Posidonia ostenfeldii, Amphibolis antarctica, Amphibolis griffithii, Halophila australis, Halophila ovalis, Ruppia megacarpa and Heterozostera tasmanica.

The fringing vegetation around the sound includes both the saltmarshes of Oyster Harbour and Princess Royal Harbour, and the sandy beach vegetation. Saltmarshes contain a variety of species including samphire, seablite, astartea, wattle, greenbush, shore rush, twig rush and saltwater paperbark. 
Freshwater species also occur in areas where substantial freshwater seepage occurs.
Sandy beach areas contain a mix of shrubs and sedges such as the grey white cushion bush, coast sword sedge, knotted club rush, sea rocket, pigface and false caper.

Fauna 
The sound comprises a wide variety of habitats that supports an abundance of marine life.
Many species of corals are present including Turbinaria frondens, Turbinaria mesenterina and Turbinaria renformis which cover an extensive area. Other coral species that can be found include Scolymia australis, Plesiastrea versipora, Coscinaraea mcneilli and Coscinaraea marshae.

A large, wild mussel population was known to exist in the sound, and now commercial mussel farms operate within the area that grow and harvest Blue mussels.

It is estimated that 203 species of fish inhabit the Oyster Harbour, Princess Royal Harbour and King George Sound, with Australian pilchards Sardinops sagax neopilchardus making up 97% of the total fish catch. Other species that are commonly found include Australian herring, leatherjackets, cobbler, tailor, Australian anchovy, garfish, sand trevally, tarwhine, flathead, tuna, snapper, Australian salmon, yellowtail scad, sea mullet, striped trumpeter, long-toothed flounder, dusky morwong and long-finned goby. The King George whiting (Sillaginodes punctatus) was first named by Cuvier in 1829 as Sillago punctata, based on an individual taken from King George Sound.

Seals are known to inhabit the sound in various locations along the coast and on the islands. The species that are sighted most often are the Australian sea lion and the New Zealand fur seal. Species that have been sighted, but are considered to be occasional visitors, include the subantarctic fur seal and the leopard seal.

Dolphins are also found in the area, and are occasionally caught and drowned in fishing nets or stranded. The common dolphin Delphinus delphis and the bottlenose dolphin Tursiops truncates have both been recorded in the area.

Southern right whales and humpback whales frequent the area between July and October when they congregate to mate and calve in the protected waters of the sound. Other whales that have been spotted in the area include minke whales, blue whales, short-finned pilot whales, false killer whales and killer whales. Sperm whales were known to visit the sound during the whaling era but none have been sighted recently, although a pod was detected further out in the Southern Ocean in 2002.

The sound becomes a perfect habitat for migratory wading birds during the summer, when an estimated 2,000-3,000 birds flock to the area to feed in the shallow mudflats of the harbours. Some of the species that can be found during the summer months include the red-necked stint and the red knot as well as sandpipers, grey plovers, red capped plovers, lesser sand plovers, grey-tailed tattlers, Eurasian whimbrels, common greenshanks, yellow-billed spoonbill, white-faced heron and stilts. Other birds that are commonly seen around the sound include cormorants, pied oystercatchers, sooty oystercatchers, Pacific gulls, Caspian terns, pelicans, ospreys and white-bellied sea eagles.

Geology 

The Western Australian south coast is formed along the edge of the southern margin of the Yilgarn craton and is fringed with prominent headlands composed of granite and gneisses formed during Proterozoic tectonic activity. Arcuate Bays that contain beaches backed by holocene dunes are found between the headlands.

King George Sound includes many islands and some islets, all comprising granitoid rocks with accumulations of soil on most.

Islands of note include Breaksea Island, Michaelmas Island, Seal Island, Mistaken Island, and Green Island.
.

Oceanography 

Tidal levels can remain static for periods of time. Semi-diurnal tides are frequent and diurnal tides are occasional.

The temperature of the water in the sound is slightly different from that of the open sea.

The salinity level within the Sound remains relatively constant ranging between 34.8 and 35.5 '‰', the lower levels occurring during heavy winter rain events when large volumes of freshwater enter the sound from the King and Kalgan rivers.

The Leeuwin Current exerts some influence in the sound as it flows eastwards along the continental shelf in the main part of the sound.

Shipwrecks 
Many wrecks exist within King George Sound.

The former whale chaser Cheynes was sold for scrap in 1961 and was subsequently sunk between Michaelmas Island and the northern shoreline of the sound.

The Lady Lyttleton sank in the Emu Point channel when repairs were attempted in 1867.

A Hobart wooden barque, the Fanny Nicholson was being used as a whaling vessel when it ran ashore during a gale in 1872. The remains can still be seen in shallow water in Frenchman Bay. Another Tasmanian whaling barque, the Runnymede, met a similar fate when it ran aground during a storm in 1881.

Two wrecks within the sound are protected under the federal Historic Shipwrecks Act 1976. These are the wooden barque Athena that sank in 1908, and the wooden boat Elvie that sank in 1923.

In 1868, Northumberland, a wooden barque laden with 2000 tonnes of coal, grounded on a reef off Bald Head near the entrance to King George Sound. The ship was freed and sailed into the sound with a broken rudder, the crew eventually abandoned ship and took to the life boats. Northumberland foundered and sank between Cape Vancouver and Breaksea Island.

Gallery

See also

Port of Albany
Whaling in Western Australia
King George Sound (Tasmania)

References

External links

Albany, Western Australia
Bays of Western Australia
South coast of Western Australia
Shipwreck areas of Western Australia
Sounds of Western Australia
Articles containing video clips
King George Sound
Whaling stations in Australia
Whaling in Australia